The Africa Movie Academy Award for Best Editing is an annual merit by the Africa Film Academy to reward movies with the best film-editing for the year.

References

Lists of award winners
Africa Movie Academy Awards